Theotokos of Kazan Church is an Eastern Orthodox church in Riga, the capital of Latvia. The church is located at Lielā Kalna iela 19/21.

References 

Churches in Riga